Herbert J. Woodall was a British mathematician.

In 1925 Lt.-Col. Allan J.C. Cunningham and Woodall gathered together all that was known about the primality and factorization of such numbers and published a small book of tables. "These tables collected from scattered sources the known prime factors for the bases 2 and 10 and also presented the authors' results of thirty years' work with these and the other bases."

Since 1925 many people have worked on filling in these tables. It is likely that this project is the longest, ongoing computational project in history. Derrick Henry Lehmer, a well known mathematician who died in 1991 was for many years a leader of these efforts. Professor Lehmer was a mathematician who was at the forefront of computing as modern electronic computers became a reality. He was also known as the inventor of some ingenious pre-electronic computing devices specifically designed for factoring numbers. These devices are currently in storage at the Computer Museum in Boston.

A generalized Woodall number is defined to be a number of the form

nbn − 1,

where n + 2 > b; if a prime can be written in this form, it is then called a generalized Woodall prime.

References

 

20th-century British mathematicians
Year of birth missing
Year of death missing